Lobeira (Spanish Lobera) is a municipality in the province of Ourense in the Galicia region of north-west Spain.

It had a population of 809 inhabitants in 2016.

References  

Municipalities in the Province of Ourense